Cyprian Kamil Norwid (– 23 May 1883), a.k.a. Cyprian Konstanty Norwid, was a nationally esteemed Polish poet, dramatist, painter, and sculptor.  

Norwid is regarded as one of the second generation of romantics. He wrote many well-known poems including Fortepian Szopena ("Chopin's Piano"), Moja piosnka [II] ("My Song [II]") and Bema pamięci żałobny-rapsod (A Funeral Rhapsody in Memory of General Bem). Norwid led a tragic and often poverty-stricken life (once he had to live in a cemetery crypt). He experienced increasing health problems, unrequited love, harsh critical reviews, and increasing social isolation. He lived abroad most of his life, especially in London and, in Paris where he died.

Norwid's original and non-conformist style was not appreciated in his lifetime and partially due to this fact, he was excluded from high society. His work was only rediscovered and appreciated by the Young Poland art movement of the late nineteenth and early twentieth century. He is now considered one of the four most important Polish Romantic poets. Other literary historians, however, consider this an oversimplification, and regard his style to be more characteristic of classicism and parnassianism.

Life

Youth 
The surname "Norwid" is a Polish form of the Lithuanian two-syllable archaic (sur)name Norvydas — from noras a wish, a desire, a goal and (iš)vysti to see, literally one, who has a desire. One of his maternal ancestors was the Polish King John III Sobieski. Born on 24 September 1821 into a Polish–Lithuanian noble family bearing the Topór coat of arms, in the Masovian village of Laskowo-Głuchy near Warsaw, Cyprian Norwid and his brother  were orphaned early. For most of their childhood, they were educated at Warsaw schools. In 1830 Norwid interrupted his schooling (not having completed the fifth grade) and entered a private school of painting. His incomplete formal education forced him to become an autodidact.

His first foray into the literary sphere occurred in the periodical Piśmiennictwo Krajowe, which published his first poem, "Mój ostatni sonet" ("My Last Sonnet"), in issue 8, 1840. In 1841-1842 he travelled through the Congress Poland.

Europe 

In 1842 Norwid left Poland, never to return. First went to Dresden in Germany. He later also visited Venice and Florence in Italy; in Florence he signed up for a course in sculpture at the Accademia di Belle Arti di Firenze. After he settled in Rome in 1844, his fiancée Kamila broke off their engagement. Later he met Maria Kalergis, née Nesselrode; they became acquaintances, but his courtship of her, and later, of her lady-in-waiting, Maria Trebicka, ended in failure. The poet then travelled to Berlin, where he participated in university lectures and meetings with  local Polonia. It was a time when Norwid made many new social, artistic and political contacts. In Berlin he was arrested due to a misunderstanding, and his short stay in prison resulted in partial deafness. After being  forced to leave Prussia in 1846, Norwid went to Brussels. During the European Revolutions of 1848, he stayed in Rome, where he met fellow Polish intellectuals Adam Mickiewicz and Zygmunt Krasiński.

During 1849–1852, Norwid lived in Paris, where he met fellow Poles Frédéric Chopin and Juliusz Słowacki, as well as Russians Ivan Turgenev and Alexander Herzen (at Emma Herwegh's salon). Financial hardship, unrequited love, political misunderstandings, and a negative critical reception of his works put Norwid in a dire situation. He lived in poverty and suffered from progressive blindness and deafness, but still managed to publish some content in the Polish-language Parisian publication Goniec polski.

U.S.A.
Norwid decided to emigrate to the United States of America in the Fall of1852,  receiving some sponsorship from Wladyslaw Zamoyski. On 11 February 1853 he arrived in New York City aboard the Margaret Evans, and he held a number of odd jobs there, including at a graphics firm. By autumn, he learned about the outbreak of the Crimean War. This made him consider a return to Europe, and he wrote to Mickiewicz and Herzen, asking for their assistance.

Back in Paris 

During April 1854, Norwid returned to Europe with Prince . He  lived in England with Krasiński's help he was finally able to return to Paris by December that year. With his artistic work revived, Norwid was able to publish several works. He took a very keen interest in the outbreak of the January Uprising in 1863. Although he could not participate personally due to his poor health, Norwid hoped to personally influence the outcome of the event.

However, despite his greatest efforts it was unable to be published until decades later. One of the reasons for this included Prince Władysław Czartoryski failing to grant the poet the loan he had promised.

In subsequent years, Norwid lived in extreme poverty and suffered from tuberculosis. His cousin, later relocated Norwid to the St. Casimir's Institute nursing home on the outskirts of Paris where he was befriended by Teodor Jełowicki who gave him material support. During the last months of his life, Norwid was weak and bed-ridden. He frequently wept and refused to speak with anyone. He died in the morning of 23 May 1883. Jełowicki personally covered the burial costs.

Legacy and commemoration 

Literary historians view Norwid's work as being too far ahead of its time to be appreciated, possessing elements of romanticism, classicism and parnassianism. Following his death, many of Norwid's works were forgotten; it was not until the Young Poland period that his finesse and style was appreciated. At that time, his work was discovered and popularised by Zenon Przesmycki, a Polish poet and literary critic who was a member of the Polish Academy of Literature. Some eventually concluded that during his life, Norwid was rejected by his contemporaries so that he could be understood by the next generation of "late grandsons."

Opinion is divided, however, as to whether he was a true Romantic artist – or if he was artistically ahead of his time. The full iconic collection of Norwid’s work was released during the period 1971–76 as Pisma Wszystkie ("Collected Works"). Comprising 11 volumes, it includes all of Norwid's poetry as well as his letters and reproductions of his artwork. Since 2011 the Scholarly Society of the Catholic University of Lublin has been publishing a new critical edition of his complete works, Dziela wszystkie, in 17 volumes. His graphic works were published in 4 volumes between 2014 and 2019. In 2011 a Polish poet and translator of Norwid into French, Christophe Jeżewski, published a pioneering study about the influence of ancient Chinese thinking on the Polish writer – Cyprian Norwid a myśl i poetyka Kraju Środka (Cyprian Norwid and the Thought and Poetics of the Middle Kingdom).

On 24 September 2001, 118 years after his death in France, an urn containing soil from the collective grave where Norwid had been buried in Paris' Montmorency cemetery was enshrined in the "Crypts of the Bards" at Wawel Cathedral. There, Norwid's remains were placed next to those of fellow Polish poets Adam Mickiewicz and Juliusz Słowacki. The cathedral's Zygmunt Bell, heard only when events of great national and religious significance occur, resounded loudly to mark the poet's return to his homeland. During a special Thanksgiving Mass held at the cathedral, the Archbishop of Kraków, cardinal Franciszek Macharski said that 74 years after the remains of Juliusz Slowacki were brought in, again the doors of the crypt of bards have opened "to receive the great poet, Cyprian Norwid, into Wawel's royal cathedral, for he was an equal of kings".

In 1966, the Polish Scouts in Chicago acquired a 240-acre parcel of land in the northwoods of Wisconsin, 20 miles west of Crivitz, Wisconsin and named it Camp Norwid in his honor. The camp is private property, and has been a forging place for generations of youth of Polish heritage from the Chicago and Milwaukee areas and from across the United States.

In 2021, on the 200th anniversary of Norwid’s birth, brothers Stephen and Timothy Quay produced a short film Vade-mecum about the poet's life and work in an attempt to promote his legacy among foreign audiences.

Well known in Poland, and a part of Polish school's cirricula, Norwid nonetheless remains obscure in English-speaking world.

The life and work of Norwid have been subject to a number of scholarly treatments. Those include monographs such as 's (2016) Cyprian Norwid. Poeta wieku dziewiętnastego (Cyprian Norwid. A Poet of the Nineteenth Century). An academic journal dedicated to the study of Norwid, has been published since 1983.

Works 

Norwid's most extensive work, Vade mecum, written between 1858 and 1865, was first published a century after his death. Some of  Norwid's works have been translated into English by Walter Whipple and Danuta Borchardt in the United States of America, and by Jerzy Pietrkiewicz and Adam Czerniawski in Britain.

In English
The Larva
Mother Tongue (Język ojczysty)
My Song
To Citizen John Brown (Do obywatela Johna Brown)
What Did You Do to Athens, Socrates? (Coś ty Atenom zrobił Sokratesie...)
In Verona (W Weronie) translated by Jarek Zawadzki

In Polish
Fortepian Szopena
Assunta (1870)

In Bengali
Poems of Cyprian Norwid (কামিল নরভিদের কবিতা) translated into Bengali language by Annonto Uzzul.

Bibliography
Jarzębowski, Józef. Norwid i Zmartwychstańcy. London: Veritas, 1960. ("Norwid and The Resurrectionists")
Kalergis, Maria. Listy do Adama Potockiego (Letters to Adam Potocki), edited by Halina Kenarowa, translated from the French by Halina Kenarowa and Róża Drojecka, Warsaw, 1986.

See also
List of Poles
Three Bards

References

External links 
Speech made by Pope John Paul II to the representatives of the Institute of Polish National Patrimony
Biography links
Norwid laid to rest in Wawel Cathedral
Repository of translated poems
 Cyprian Kamil Norwid collected works (Polish)
 Profile of Cyprian Norwid at Culture.pl
 
 
Why You Should Read Norwid, Poland’s Starving Time Traveller from Culture.pl

1821 births
1883 deaths
People from Wyszków County
19th-century Polish painters
19th-century Polish male artists
Polish sculptors
Polish male sculptors
Polish male dramatists and playwrights
Polish Roman Catholics
Roman Catholic writers
Activists of the Great Emigration
19th-century sculptors
19th-century Polish poets
19th-century Polish dramatists and playwrights
Polish male poets
19th-century Polish male writers
19th-century Polish philosophers
Polish male painters